Margarita or Margherita Gabassi (active mid-18th-century) was an Italian woman painter active in her native Modena, painting humorous subjects (quadri di faceto argomento). She is mentioned by Luigi Lanzi, but none of her works are found in the Pinacoteca of Modena.

References

Year of birth unknown
Year of death unknown
18th-century Italian painters
Painters from Modena
Italian women painters
18th-century Italian women artists